Malolwane is a village in Kgatleng District of Botswana. The village is located 70 km east of Gaborone, and the population was 2,369 in 2001 census.

References
The village has Wards (Dikgoro or Dikgotlana), Matlou, Matlotla, Phaphane, Malebye, Sione, Mokobeng, Motlabane, Deep Level. It is growing due to availability of plots around and attracting closer and farther inhabitants to make it their primary home.

Kgatleng District
Villages in Botswana